Chaerephon (known as Chaerephon bats or lesser mastiff bats) is a genus of Old World free-tailed bats in the family Molossidae. Molecular sequence data indicates that Chaerephon, Mops and Tadarida are not monophyletic taxa.  The closest relatives of Chaerephon jobimena of Madagascar are Tadarida aegyptiaca of Africa and southwest Asia, and Tadarida brasiliensis of the Americas, which form a clade believed to be about 9.8 million years old. However, the grouping of Chaerephon minus C. jobimena plus Mops was found to be monophyletic.

Species within this genus are:
Chaerephon atsinanana
Duke of Abruzzi's free-tailed bat, Chaerephon aloysiisabaudiae
Ansorge's free-tailed bat, Chaerephon ansorgei
Gland-tailed free-tailed bat, Chaerephon bemmeleni
Spotted free-tailed bat, Chaerephon bivittatus
Fijian mastiff bat, Chaerephon bregullae
Chapin's free-tailed bat, Chaerephon chapini
Gallagher's free-tailed bat, Chaerephon gallagheri
Northern freetail bat, Chaerephon jobensis
Black and red free-tailed bat, Chaerephon jobimena
Northern free-tailed bat, Chaerephon johorensis
Grandidier's free-tailed bat, Chaerephon leucogaster
Lappet-eared free-tailed bat, Chaerephon major
Nigerian free-tailed bat, Chaerephon nigeriae
Wrinkle-lipped free-tailed bat, Chaerephon plicatus
Little free-tailed bat, Chaerephon pumilus
Chaerephon pusillus
Russet free-tailed bat, Chaerephon russatus
Solomons mastiff bat, Chaerephon solomonis
São Tomé free-tailed bat, Chaerephon tomensis

References

 
Molossidae
Bat genera
Taxa named by George Edward Dobson